
Werner Neumann (13 May 1905 – 4 July 1970) was a general in the Wehrmacht of Nazi Germany during World War II who commanded the 563rd Volksgrenadier Division.  He was a recipient of the Knight's Cross of the Iron Cross.

Neumann surrendered to the Red Army in May 1945 in the Courland Pocket. Convicted as a war criminal in the Soviet Union, he was held until 1955.

Awards and decorations 

 Knight's Cross of the Iron Cross on 5 September 1944 as Oberst and commander of Grenadier-Regiment 121

References

Citations

Bibliography

 

1905 births
1970 deaths
Major generals of the German Army (Wehrmacht)
Recipients of the Gold German Cross
Recipients of the Knight's Cross of the Iron Cross
German prisoners of war in World War II held by the Soviet Union